Sahara is a 1943 American action war film directed by Zoltán Korda and starring Humphrey Bogart as an American tank commander in Libya who, along with a handful of Allied soldiers, tries to defend an isolated well with a limited supply of water from a German Afrika Korps battalion during the Western Desert Campaign of World War II.

The story is based on the novel Patrol by Philip MacDonald, and an incident depicted in the 1936 Soviet film The Thirteen by Mikhail Romm. The adaptation is by John Howard Lawson, who later was a member of the blacklisted Hollywood Ten. Sahara was remade by André de Toth as a Western called Last of the Comanches (1953), and three decades later by Brian Trenchard-Smith as the American-Australian television film Sahara (1995).

Critics praised the film for its blend of action, suspense and poignancy. J. Carrol Naish earned an Oscar nomination Best Supporting Actor for his role as an Italian prisoner; Rudolph Maté was nominated for Best Cinematography (Black-and-White); and John Livadary was nominated for Best Sound.

Plot
In 1942, the crew of Lulubelle, a United States Army M3 Lee tank attached to the British Eighth Army and commanded by Master Sergeant Joe Gunn, become separated from their unit during a general retreat from German forces after the fall of Tobruk. Heading south across the Libyan Desert to rejoin the rest of their unit, Gunn and his crew, Doyle and "Waco", come across a bombed-out field hospital, where they pick up British Army medical officer Captain Halliday, four Commonwealth soldiers and Free French Corporal Leroux. Halliday, the only officer, cedes command to the more experienced Gunn.

Riding on the tank, the group soon comes upon a Sudan Defence Force Sergeant Major Tambul and his Italian prisoner, Giuseppe. Tambul volunteers to lead them to a well at Hassan Barani. Gunn insists that they leave the Italian behind, but, after driving a few hundred feet, Gunn relents and lets Giuseppe join them.

En route, Luftwaffe pilot Captain von Schletow strafes the tank, seriously wounding Clarkson, one of the British soldiers. The German fighter aircraft is shot down and von Schletow is captured. Arriving at Hassan Barani, the group finds the well is dry, and Clarkson succumbs to his wounds.

Tambul guides them to another desert well at Bir Acroma, but it provides only a trickle of water. While the group collect as much water as they can, German scouts arrive in a half-track. Gunn captures two of them and learns that a German mechanized battalion, desperate for water, is following close behind. Gunn persuades his men to make a stand to delay the Germans while Waco takes the half-track for reinforcements. Gunn releases the German soldiers to carry back an offer to their commander to swap food for water, giving the false impression there is plenty of water.

When the German battalion arrives, a battle of wills begins between Gunn and the German commander, Major von Falken. By now the well has run dry, but Gunn keeps up the pretense and changes his offer to swap water for guns to buy time. The Germans reject the terms and mount several frontal attacks, which take a toll on the defenders. 

During one attack, von Schletow stabs Giuseppe when the Italian denounces fascism and refuses to help him escape. Before he dies, Giuseppe manages to warn Gunn. Tambul chases von Schletow down and kills him before he can tell the Germans the truth about the well, but Tambul is shot dead. After a second parley between Leroux and von Falken ends in another stalemate, von Falken has his men shoot Leroux in the back as the Frenchman returns to his own side. Gunn and his men return fire, killing von Falken.

The Germans begin what appears to be a final assault, but turns into a full-blown surrender. They drop their weapons and claw across the sand towards the well. To Gunn's shock, a German shell that exploded near the well has tapped into a source of water, filling the well. While the surviving Germans drink, Gunn and Bates, the only Allied survivors, disarm them. Later, as they march their prisoners east, Gunn and Bates are met by Allied troops guided by Waco. They receive news of the Allied victory at the First Battle of El Alamein, turning back Rommel's Afrika Korps.

Cast
 Humphrey Bogart as M/Sgt. Joe Gunn 
 Bruce Bennett as Waco Hoyt
 J. Carrol Naish as Giuseppe
 Lloyd Bridges as Fred Clarkson
 Rex Ingram as Sgt. Major Tambul
 Richard Aherne as Capt. Jason Halliday (as Richard Nugent)
 Dan Duryea as Jimmy Doyle
 Carl Harbord as Marty Williams
 Patrick O'Moore as Osmond "Ozzie" Bates 
 Louis Mercier as Jean Leroux, "Frenchie" (as Louis T. Mercier)
 Guy Kingsford as Peter Stegman
 Kurt Kreuger as Captain von Schletow (as Kurt Krueger)
 John Wengraf as Major Hans Von Falken

Production
The lead role was initially offered to Gary Cooper, Glenn Ford and Brian Donlevy before Bogart. According to Hedda Hopper, Donlevy's wife, Marjorie Lane, was expecting a baby and he did not want to be stuck on location. (A daughter, Judy, was born on February 20.) Variety, however, reported that Donlevy was tired of making war films and Bogart was weary of gangster roles, so the actors swapped assignments; Donlevy stepped into My Friend Curley (though he was replaced by Cary Grant) and Bogart took Somewhere in the Sahara (the film's working title).

Production began on January 29, 1943, and wrapped up on April 17. The cast and crew spent eleven weeks on location in the Imperial County, California, portion of the Anza-Borrego Desert State Park near the Salton Sea. Soldiers and equipment of the United States 4th Armored Division, then training at the Desert Training Center, were used as extras. The soldiers were billeted in tents at the location.

The American tank, nicknamed "Lulubelle," was a 28-ton (25.4 t) medium tank with 30 and 50 caliber machine guns and a 75 millimeter cannon. The tank required 100 octane fuel. Because no German equipment was available for the production, U.S. equipment was substituted and dressed with German markings. The aircraft that attacks the tank was an early Allison-powered P-51 Mustang. The German Sdkf-251 half-track and MG-34 machine guns were an American M2 with a M49 ring mounted with a Vickers medium machine gun.

In 1992, Kurt Kreuger was quoted by the San Francisco Chronicle on the emotions inherent in making the film, in which he portrayed a stereotypical Nazi:
I was running across the dunes when Tambul jumped on top of me and pressed my head into the sand to suffocate me. Only Zoltán forgot to yell cut, and Ingram was so emotionally caught up in the scene that he kept pressing my face harder and harder.

Finally, I went unconscious. Nobody knew this. Even the crew was transfixed, watching this dramatic 'killing.' If Zoltán hadn't finally said cut, as an afterthought, it would have been all over for me.

The production was beset by the usual difficulties on a desert location: sunburn, sandstorms, and heat. Korda had 2,000 tons of sand hauled onto the set to cover an area of hard-packed soil. Ripples and swirls in the sand were enhanced by painting the sand and then blowing it with a wind machine. Similarly, shadows were spray-painted on the hills to make them stand out. Makeup artist Henry Pringle devised a technique to imitate facial perspiration by coating the actors' faces with vaseline and then spraying them with water. Bogart's third wife, Mayo Methot, the only woman on location, reportedly brought him lunch every day from Brawley. Some of the cast went to nearby Mexicali for dinners.  No women appear in the film.

Historical background
Bogart's character makes reference to events that occurred in May–June 1942. The British had received many American M3 tanks (the tank seen in the film), and a small group of American advisors and crews trained them in the use of the equipment.

The British were routed at the Battle of Gazala, an important battle of the Western Desert Campaign, fought around the port of Tobruk. As shown in Sahara, many of their tanks were damaged and had to be abandoned due to the 8th Army's retreat. General Rommel pursued them into Egypt. The British were finally able to check Rommel's advance at the First Battle of El Alamein. The two Allied survivors learn of this victory at the end of the film.

Reception
Reviews of Sahara generally were positive, with Variety noting, "Script [adapted by James O'Hanlon from a story by Philip MacDonald] is packed with pithy dialog, lusty action and suspense, and logically and well-devised situations avoiding ultra-theatrics throughout. It's an all-male cast, but absence of romance is not missed in the rapid-fire unfolding of vivid melodrama."

Critic Nelson B. Bell, in The Washington Post, called it "one of the best-balanced of the starker war pictures ... that by turns is tortured, compassionate, thrilling and always of engrossing interest."

The Boston Globe called the film "brilliantly acted ... 'Sahara' doesn't spare the punches–they hit you in the face emotionally and it is literally impossible to sit unmoved through this vivid story. There isn't a smidgen of love interest in the picture and not a woman in the cast. This is war. There are deaths and tragedies—but there's a final ironic triumph, too. Sergt. Gunn holds the power of life or death over an Italian prisoner, and when J. Carroll Naish pleads for his life, the scene is one of the most poignant of the year's film moments."

Bosley Crowther in his review for The New York Times concentrated on the star-power of Bogart. "Those rugged, indomitable qualities which Humphrey Bogart has so masterfully displayed in most of his recent pictures—and even before, in his better gangster roles—have been doubled and concentrated in 'Sahara,' a Columbia film about warfare in the Libyan desert, which came to the Capitol yesterday. And a capital picture it is, too—as rugged as Mr. Bogart all the way and in a class with that memorable picture which it plainly resembles, The Lost Patrol."

New York Herald Tribune critic Otis L. Guernsey Jr. praised Bogart's understated style, calling it "exactly what is needed in war melodramas, which have too often been overstated to the point of ridicule. It has been used to best advantage in this instance. It is good to see a portrayal of an American soldier who looks on the war with a certain amount of distaste, but who faces both death and good fortune with persistent courage and realistic calm." Korda's direction was also called "excellent ... The action and pictorial footage is more important than the dialogue ..."

Sahara  earned three Oscar nominations: Best Sound (John Livadary), Best Cinematography (Black-and-White) (Rudolph Maté), and Best Supporting Actor by J. Carrol Naish for his role as an Italian prisoner.

In other media
In 1995 Jim Belushi starred in the Bogart role in a TV remake also titled Sahara.

The tank commanded by Sgt. Tree (Dan Aykroyd) in director Steven Spielberg's World War II comedy film 1941 is named "Lulubelle" as a homage to Sahara.

See also
 List of American films of 1943

References

Notes

Citations

Bibliography

 Barr, Niell. Pendulum of War: The Three Battles of El Alamein. Woodstock, New York: Overlook Press, 2005. .
 Evans, Alun. Brassey's Guide to War Films. Dulles, Virginia: Potomac Books, 2000. .
 Schatz, Thomas. Boom and Bust: American Cinema in the 1940s. Oakland, California: University of California Press, 1999.  .

External links

 
 
 
 
 
 
  "War in the Sahara, Bogart-style", from Eve's Magazine

1943 films
1943 war films
American war films
American black-and-white films
Columbia Pictures films
Films about armoured warfare
Films directed by Zoltán Korda
Films set in Libya
Films shot in California
North African campaign films
World War II films made in wartime
Films scored by Miklós Rózsa
Films with screenplays by Sidney Buchman
Films based on Patrol
Siege films
1940s English-language films
Films set in the Sahara